Jason Naidovski (born 19 July 1989) is an Australian footballer.

Biography
Jason previously played for the Australian Institute of Sport in the Victorian Premier League. He scored a hat-trick against the Fawkner Blues in his final game for the AIS.

Naidovski made his mark on the A-League scene scoring a late winner against Wellington Phoenix in Round 1 of the 2009–10 A-League season. Fellow Jets' striker Sean Rooney crossed the ball into Naidovski who neatly headed the ball into the bottom corner of the net. In September 2014 Jason announced his retirement at 25. Reason of his early retirement was because of on-going knee issues. He requires a fourth knee reconstruction in 5 years.

Honours
With Australia:
 AFF U19 Youth Championship: 2008

References

External links
 Newcastle Jets profile
 FFA - Young Socceroos profile

1989 births
Living people
Australian people of Macedonian descent
Australian soccer players
A-League Men players
Newcastle Jets FC players
Australian Institute of Sport soccer players
New South Wales Institute of Sport alumni
Association football forwards
Mounties Wanderers FC players